Mount Carmel Community Hospital is a short-stay rehabilitation hospital in Churchtown, Dublin, Ireland.

History
The hospital was founded by the Sisters of the Little Company of Mary and officially opened by John Charles McQuaid, Archbishop of Dublin, as Mount Carmel Hospital in August 1950. A purpose-built facility was completed in October 1960.

In 2002, the hospital received Joint Commission International accreditation. It was acquired by Harlequin Healthcare, a company controlled by Gerry Conlan who also owned Aut Even Hospital in Kilkenny and St. Joseph's Hospital, Sligo, for €50 million in July 2006. Following the acquisition, Conlan's business evolved to become Mount Carmel Medical Group. After Conlan's business got into financial difficulties, the National Asset Management Agency took control of the hospital in 2010.

In January 2014, it was announced that the financial support from National Asset Management Agency propping up the hospital operations was being withdrawn and that the High Court had approved a request to appoint a liquidator. Following the closure of the hospital, the circumstances leading up to the closure were discussed by the Oireachtas Joint Committee on Health and Children on 18 February 2014.

The hospital was bought by the Health Service Executive for a reported €11 million in September 2014. It re-opened as a short-stay rehabilitation hospital known as Mount Carmel Community Hospital in September 2015.

Services
Specialities provided include dermatology, dental surgery, otolaryngology (ENT), general surgery, urology, obstetrics and gynaecology, ophthalmology, orthopaedics, pathology, plastic surgery, physiotherapy, and radiology.

References

Hospital buildings completed in 1950
Hospitals established in 1950
Hospitals in Dún Laoghaire–Rathdown
1949 establishments in Ireland
Health Service Executive hospitals